KASX may refer to:

 John F. Kennedy Memorial Airport (ICAO code KASX)
 KASX-LP, a defunct low-power television station (channel 22) formerly licensed to Sweetwater, Texas, United States